Robert Sledge (born March 9, 1968) is an American musician, best known for his work with Ben Folds Five.

Biography
Robert Sledge began playing bass guitar at the age of eleven. His brother was playing guitar at his house so he also learned how to play the guitar at the same time. Before playing with Ben Folds Five he was bassist for the bands Toxic Popsickle and Lexx Luthor (with Godsmack's Sully Erna).

Ben Folds Five
Robert was a founding member of the piano-rock trio Ben Folds Five. Robert was the bass player for the group as well as taking up backup vocal duties on almost every song at the time. During the Reinhold Messner tour Robert began to use synths on stage as well as playing electric & acoustic basses until the band's break up in 2000.

Robert is known for his use of a Big Muff distortion pedal and rockstar flair. Sledge played a Hamer Blitz Bass throughout the early years of Ben Folds Five. It was used on their eponymous debut album. He later switched to a Fender Jazz Bass to record Whatever and Ever Amen, while playing his Gibson and Epiphone Les Paul basses in live shows from that time to the present. Sledge had a sponsorship from Epiphone for his use of the Les Paul Bass, which can be seen in the Ben Folds Five performance on Sessions at West 54th. He also plays an upright double bass for several songs, including "Brick".

Post-Ben Folds Five
After Ben Folds Five broke up, Robert Sledge performed for one summer with the short-lived rock group Brother Seeker, a band composed of Robert and former Squirrel Nut Zippers members Tom Maxwell and Ken Mosher. According to John D. Luerssen's Rivers' Edge: The Weezer Story Sledge was heavily considered to replace Mikey Welsh as the new Weezer bassist in 2001 but instead Scott Shriner took the job.

He later joined the band International Orange, as a songwriter, bassist and vocalist. International Orange broke up in 2005.

Robert currently lives in Chapel Hill, North Carolina, where he gives music lessons and plays in local rock bands the "Bob Sledge Band", and "Surrender Human." Ben Folds himself mentioned Robert in his song Not The Same when part of the lyrics in the song says “You took a trip and climbed a tree at Robert Sledge’s party”.

Personal life
Sledge lives in Chapel Hill, North Carolina with his wife and son, Henry Sledge, who goes by Archie.

References 

 The Virginia Sun – February 17, 1987 "Beam shines music on Virginia" – Frank Roberts

External links

American bass guitarists
American double-bassists
Male double-bassists
Living people
Ben Folds Five members
1968 births
21st-century double-bassists